Events in 2005 in animation.



Events

January
 January 7: 
 The first episode of Pocoyo airs.

February
 February 6: The pilot episode of American Dad! airs. 
 February 13: The Simpsons episode "Pranksta Rap" first airs, guest starring rapper 50 Cent.
 February 20: 
 The first episode of Robot Chicken airs.
 The Simpsons episode "There's Something About Marrying" premieres, in which the character Patty Bouvier outs herself as a lesbian. 
 February 21: The first episode of Avatar: The Last Airbender airs. 
 February 27: 77th Academy Awards:
 The Incredibles, directed by Brad Bird and produced by the Walt Disney Company, wins the Academy Award for Best Animated Feature.
 Ryan by Chris Landreth wins the Academy Award for Best Animated Short Film.
 In their 100 Greatest series, the British TV channel Channel 4 broadcasts the 100 Greatest Cartoons!, a list of the 100 greatest animated cartoons, as voted by viewers.

March
 March 11: The first episode of Wonder Showzen airs, an adult parody of children's educational shows.
 March 13: The Simpsons episode "Goo Goo Gai Pan" premieres, guest starring Lucy Liu and Robert Wagner.
 March 25: The first episode of Krypto the Superdog is broadcast.
 March 28: Turner Broadcasting splits Adult Swim off from Cartoon Network after the block debuted in 2001, as the Nielsen Media Research could treat it as a separate channel for ratings purposes.
 March 31: Don Hertzfeldt's World of Tomorrow premiers.

April
 April 14: Noitamina, a programing block created for Fuji TV, premieres with its first program Honey and Clover.

May
 May 1: The Animation Domination programming block premieres on Fox, along with Family Guy returning after a three-year cancellation, sparking popularity and strong DVD sales. 
 May 6: SpongeBob SquarePants returns after a seven-month hiatus with the fourth season premiering.
 May 9: Japanese animation studio A-1 Pictures is founded.
 May 10: Marco Nguyen, Pierre Perifel, Xavier Ramonède, Olivier Staphylas and Rémi Zaarour's Le Building premiers.
 May 13: Michel Ocelot and Bénédicte Galup's Kirikou and the Wild Beasts premiers.
 May 25: Eric Darnell and Tom McGrath's Madagascar premiers.

July
July 8: The first episode of Camp Lazlo airs.
 July 9:
 Disneyland receives a star at the Hollywood Walk of Fame, the first and only theme park to receive this honor.
 The first episode of Catscratch and Time Warp Trio airs.

September
 September 4: Wallace & Gromit: The Curse of the Were-Rabbit premieres.
 September 6: The first episode of Go, Diego, Go! airs.
 September 7: Tim Burton and Mike Johnson's Corpse Bride is released.
 September 17: The first episode of Johnny Test airs.
 September 23: Nicktoons rebranded itself as Nicktoons Network. It remains rebranded for 4 years before returning to its former name.
 September 26: PBS Kids Sprout is launched by a joint venture between PBS, Comcast, HIT Entertainment, and Sesame Workshop when the new network replaces PBS Kids.

October
 October 10: A fire destroys most of Aardman Animations' archive warehouse, including most of Nick Park's creations and the models and sets used in the film Chicken Run. Some of the original Wallace and Gromit models and sets, as well as the master prints of the finished films, were elsewhere and survived.
 October 23: Bratz Rock Angelz premieres.
 October 30: The Walt Disney Company’s Chicken Little premieres

November
 November 6: The first episode of The Boondocks airs.

December
 December 6: Run Wrake's award-winning animated short Rabbit premieres.
 December 11: The Simpsons episode "The Italian Bob" first airs, in which the family travels to Italy.
 December 20: Toy Story is added to the National Film Registry.
December 26: The first episode of My Gym Partner's a Monkey airs as a sneak peek before the series' official premiere on February 24, 2006. 
December 27: The first episode of the original Ben 10 series airs.

Awards
 Academy Award for Best Animated Feature: Wallace & Gromit: The Curse of the Were-Rabbit
 Animation Kobe Feature Film Award: Zeta Gundam A New Translation: Heirs to the Stars
 Annie Award for Best Animated Feature: Wallace & Gromit: The Curse of the Were-Rabbit
 Goya Award for Best Animated Film: Midsummer Dream
 Japan Media Arts Festival Animation Award: Flow
 Mainichi Film Awards – Animation Grand Award: Fullmetal Alchemist the Movie: Conqueror of Shamballa

Films released

 January 6 - DragonBlade: The Legend of Lang (Hong Kong)
 January 10 - Among the Thorns (Sweden)
 January 11: 
 The Land Before Time XI: Invasion of the Tinysauruses (United States)
 Lil' Pimp (United States)
 January 18 - Tom and Jerry: Blast Off to Mars (United States)
 January 29 - Tennis no Ōjisama – Futari no Samurai (Japan)
 February 1 - Mulan II (United States)
 February 2 - The Magic Roundabout (United Kingdom and France)
 February 3 - Felix – A Rabbit on a World Tour (Germany)
 February 5 - Air (2005 film) (Japan)
 February 8 - Aloha, Scooby-Doo!  (United States)
 February 11 - Pooh's Heffalump Movie (United States)
 February 24 - Pirates in the Pacific (Peru)
 March 4 - Gisaku (Spain)
 March 5 - One Piece: Baron Omatsuri and the Secret Island (Japan)
 March 6 - Barbie: Fairytopia (United States)
 March 8:
 Candy Land: The Great Lollipop Adventure (United States)
 VeggieTales: Duke and the Great Pie War (United States)
 March 11 - Robots (United States)
 March 15 - Tugger: The Jeep 4x4 Who Wanted to Fly (United States)
 March 25 - Valiant (United Kingdom)
 April 6 - My Little Pony: Friends are Never Far Away (United States)
 April 8 - Kim Possible: So the Drama (United States)
 April 9 - Detective Conan: Strategy Above the Depths (Japan)
 April 16:
 Crayon Shin-chan: The Legend Called Buri Buri 3 Minutes Charge (Japan)
 Futari wa Pretty Cure Max Heart the Movie (Japan)
 April 29 - The Golden Blaze (United States)
 May 8 - Fire Ball (Taiwan)
 May 17 - Dinotopia: Quest for the Ruby Sunstone (United States)
 May 27 - Madagascar (United States)
 May 28 - Mobile Suit Zeta Gundam: A New Translation I – Heirs to the Stars (Japan)
 May 30 - The King: The Story of King David (United States)
 June 2 - Ark (United States and South Korea)
 June 14 - Tarzan II (United States)
 June 25 - VeggieTales: Minnesota Cuke and the Search for Samson's Hairbrush (United States)
 July 1 - Midsummer Dream (Spain and Portugal)
 July 8 - The Book of the Dead (Japan)
 July 16 - Pokémon: Lucario and the Mystery of Mew (Japan)
 July 23 - Fullmetal Alchemist the Movie: Conqueror of Shamballa (Japan)
 August 6 - Naruto the Movie 2: Great Clash! The Illusionary Ruins at the Depths of the Earth (Japan)
 August 12: 
 Empress Chung (South Korea and North Korea)
 Escape from Cluster Prime (United States)
 Renart the Fox (Luxembourg)
 August 19:
 Imaginum (Mexico)
 The Proud Family Movie (United States)
 August 20 - xxxHolic: A Midsummer Night's Dream (Japan)
 August 30: 
 Lilo & Stitch 2: Stitch Has a Glitch (United States)
 My Scene Goes Hollywood (United States)
 September - Little Soldier Zhang Ga (China)
 September 6 - Inspector Gadget's Biggest Caper Ever (Canada and United States)
 September 13 - Pooh's Heffalump Halloween Movie (United States)
 September 14 - Final Fantasy VII Advent Children (Japan)
 September 17 - Here Comes Peter Cottontail: The Movie (United States)
 September 18 - Barbie and the Magic of Pegasus 3-D (United States)
 September 20 - LeapFrog: Learn to Read at the Storybook Factory (United States)
 September 23 - Corpse Bride (United States)
 September 26 - Heidi (United Kingdom, Canada, and Germany)
 September 27 - Stewie Griffin: The Untold Story (United States)
 September 29 - The Little Polar Bear 2 – The Mysterious Island (Germany)
 October 4 - Bratz – Rock Angelz (United States)
 October 7 - Wallace & Gromit: The Curse of the Were-Rabbit (United Kingdom)
 October 11: 
 Bionicle 3: Web of Shadows (United States)
 Stuart Little 3: Call of the Wild (United States)
 Tom and Jerry: The Fast and the Furry (United States)
 October 16 - Negadon: The Monster from Mars (Japan)
 October 18:
 The Batman vs Dracula: The Animated Movie (United States)
 Care Bears: Big Wish Movie (Canada)
 The Legend of Frosty the Snowman (United States)
 October 21 - Hanuman (India)
 October 25:
 My Little Pony: A Very Minty Christmas (United States)
 Street Fighter Alpha: Generations (Japan)
 October 28 - The Three Musketeers (Denmark and Latvia)
 October 29:
 Mobile Suit Zeta Gundam: A New Translation II – Lovers (Japan)
 VeggieTales: Lord of the Beans (United States)
 November 4:
 Chicken Little (United States)
 Disaster! (United States)
 El Guerrero sin Nombre (Argentina and Spain)
 November 22 - Kong: King of Atlantis (United States)
 November 25:
 Olentzero and the Magic Log (Spain)
 Pettson and Findus: Pettson's Promise (Sweden)
 December 2 - The Happy Elf (United States)
 December 7 - Kirikou and the Wild Beasts (France)
 December 10: 
 Futari wa Pretty Cure Max Heart 2: Friends of the Snow-Laden Sky (Japan)
 On a Stormy Night (Japan)
 December 13:
 Kronk's New Groove (United States)
 Scooby-Doo! in Where's My Mummy? (United States)
 December 16 - Hoodwinked! (United States)
 December 23 - Gulliver's Travel (India)
 December 25 - Xuxinha and Guto against the Space Monsters (Brazil)
 December 30 - Thru the Moebius Strip (China)
 Specific date unknown:
 Action Man: X Missions – The Movie (United States)
 Ali Baba and the Forty Thieves: The Lost Scimitar of Arabia (United States)
 Christmas in New York (Italy)
 Klay World: Off the Table (United States)
 Mother Teresa (Italy)
 Muttabar (Ukraine)
 Rest On Your Shoulder (China)
 The Toy Warrior (South Korea)
 Txirri, Mirri y Txiribiton (Spain)

Television series debuts

Television series endings

Births

January
 January 8: Collin Dean, American actor (voice of Hiroshi in Welcome to the Space Show, Tiffany and Candy Kids in Adventure Time, Gregory in Over the Garden Wall, Lincoln Loud in seasons 1-3 of The Loud House, Oto in Doki, Camper in the American Dad! episode "Camp Campawanda", announcer for Boomerang).
 January 25: Avantika Vandanapu, American actress (voice of Kamala in Mira, Royal Detective, Sareena Tapoor in the Mickey Mouse Mixed-Up Adventures episode "A Gollywood Wedding!").

February
 February 25: Noah Jupe, British actor (voice of Peter in The Magician's Elephant).

May
 May 5: Gabrielle Nevaeh Green, American actress (voice of Clawdeen Wolf in Monster High).
 May 19: Jack Gore, American actor (voice of young Valiente in Ferdinand, young Patrick Star in The SpongeBob Movie: Sponge on the Run).

June
 June 14: Tamara Smart, English actress (voice of Siobhan in Wendell & Wild).
 June 25: Kylie Cantrall, American actress and singer (voice of Savannah Meades in Ron's Gone Wrong).

July
 July 12: Isaac Ryan Brown, American actor (voice of Gus Porter in The Owl House, Bingo in seasons 1-3 of Puppy Dog Pals, Goby in season 4 of Bubble Guppies, Haruna Kitumba in Miles from Tomorrowland, Chomper in The Land Before Time XIV: Journey of the Brave, Stinky in The Stinky & Dirty Show).
 July 25: Pierce Gagnon, American actor (voice of Tim Templeton in The Boss Baby: Back in Business, Tiago in Rio 2, young Fred Jones in Scoob!, Ryan Miller in The Loud House episode "Family Bonding").

August 
 August 8: Kitana Turnbull, American actress (voice of Kit Secord in The Rocketeer, Sydney in Puppy Dog Pals, Lyds in Spirit Riding Free, Olivia in Elena of Avalor, Minu in Shimmer and Shine).

September 
 September 7: Ruth Righi, American actress (voice of the title character in Eureka!).

October
 October 1: Rosalie Chiang, American actress (voice of Mei Lee in Turning Red).

December
 December 14: Mia Sinclair Jenness, American actress (voice of the title character in Fancy Nancy, young Powder in Arcane).
 December 30: Brady Noon, American actor (voice of Greg Heffley in Diary of a Wimpy Kid and Diary of a Wimpy Kid: Rodrick Rules, Raphael in Teenage Mutant Ninja Turtles: Mutant Mayhem).

Deaths

January
 January 15: Dan Lee, Canadian animator and character designer (Disney Television Animation, Pixar), dies at age 35.
 January 24: Steve Susskind, American actor (voice of J.J. Eureka Vatos in The Tick, Irate Chef in The Emperor's New Groove, Jerry Slugworth in Monsters, Inc., Sergeant Squash in the DuckTales episode "Duckworth's Revolt", Maxie Zeus in the Batman: The Animated Series episode "Fire from Olympus"), dies in an automobile accident at age 62.
 January 23: Johnny Carson, American television host, comedian, writer and producer (voiced himself in The Simpsons episode "Krusty Gets Kancelled"), dies from respiratory failure at age 79.
 January 25: Chad Grothkopf, American comics artist and animator (Walt Disney Animation Studios, Fleischer Studios, Hanna-Barbera, DePatie-Freleng Enterprises, Chuck Jones, Jay Ward Productions, Terrytoons, Tiny Toon Adventures), dies at age 90 or 91.
 January 29: Ron Feinberg, American actor (voice of Titanus in Teenage Mutant Ninja Turtles, Ming the Merciless in Defenders of the Earth, Vladimir Goudenov Grizzlikof in Darkwing Duck), dies at age 72.

February
 February 1: John Vernon, Canadian actor (voice of Rupert Thorne in Batman: The Animated Series, Iron Man and Namor in The Marvel Super Heroes, Thunderbolt Ross in The Incredible Hulk, Shao Kahn in Mortal Kombat: Defenders of the Realm, Prosecutor in Heavy Metal, the title character in Wildfire, Warden Toadblatt in The Grim Adventures of Billy & Mandy, Nohrin Judge in Delgo, Doctor Strange in the Spider-Man episode of the same name, Principal Dinkler in the Duckman episode "From Brad to Worse"), dies at age 72.
 February 4: Ossie Davis, American actor, director, writer, and activist (voice of Yar in Dinosaur), dies at age 87.
 February 28: Pam Carter, American voice actor (voice of Lena Mack in Street Sharks, Mrs. Andrews in Archie's Weird Mysteries, Sea Beast in Strawberry Shortcake, additional voices in Liberty's Kids) and voice director (DIC Entertainment), dies at age 50.

March
 March 5: Vance Gerry, American storyboard artist, concept artist, and character designer (Walt Disney Animation Studios), dies at age 75.
 March 10: Debbi Besserglick, Israeli actress (dub voice of Arthur Read), dies at age 49.
 March 13: Hal Seeger, American animator, comics writer and comics artist (Fleischer Studios, Batfink, Milton the Monster), dies at age 87.

April
 April 11: John Bennett, English actor (Captain Holly in Watership Down, Don in The Plague Dogs), dies at age 76.
 April 21: Bob Gardiner, American animator (co-director of Closed Mondays) and inventor (Claymation), dies at age 54. 
 April 22: Paul Beard, American animator (Blue's Clues, Wonder Pets!) dies at age 27.
 April 23: Romano Scarpa, Italian comics artist, writer and animator (La piccola fiammiferaia), dies at age 77.

May
 May 6: Joe Grant, American animator, character designer and screenwriter (Walt Disney Company, designed the Evil Queen in Snow White and the Seven Dwarfs), dies at age 96.
May 19: Henry Corden, American actor (voice of Paw Rugg in The Hillbilly Bears, Ookla the Mok in Thundarr the Barbarian, continued voice of Fred Flintstone), dies at 85.
 May 17: Frank Gorshin, American actor, impressionist, and comedian (voice of Daffy Duck and Foghorn Leghorn in Superior Duck, Yosemite Sam in From Hare to Eternity, Sir 1023 and Quart in Rudolph's Shiny New Year, Hugo Strange in The Batman, The Reverend Jack Cheese in The Ren & Stimpy Show episode of the same name, Barney Stone and Clovy in the Johnny Bravo episode "Blarney Buddies"), dies at age 72.
 May 21: Howard Morris, American actor (voice of Gopher in Winnie the Pooh and the Honey Tree and Winnie the Pooh and the Blustery Day, the title characters in Atom Ant and Munro, Mr. Peebles in Magilla Gorilla, Jughead Jones in The Archies, Professor Icenstein and Luigi La Bounci in Galaxy High, Flem in Cow & Chicken), dies at age 85.
May 22: Thurl Ravenscroft, American actor and singer (voice of Monstro the Whale in Pinocchio, the alligator in Lady and the Tramp, Tony the Tiger in the animated ads, Paul Bunyan in Paul Bunyan, Captain in One Hundred and One Dalmatians, singer of You're A Mean One, Mr. Grinch in How the Grinch Stole Christmas, Billy Bass in The Aristocats, Kirby in The Brave Little Toaster), dies at age 91.

June
 June 6: Anne Bancroft, American actress (voice of Queen Ant in Antz, Empress Sedessa in Delgo, Dr. Zweig in The Simpsons episode "Fear of Flying"), dies from uterine cancer at age 73.
 June 14:
 Robie Lester, American actress (voice of Miss Jessica in Santa Claus Is Comin' to Town, singing voice for Eva Gabor in The Aristocats and The Rescuers), dies at age 80.
 Barrington Bunce, English-born American animator (Hanna-Barbera, Spider-Woman, Ruby-Spears Enterprises, Garbage Pail Kids, The Simpsons), storyboard artist (Dink, the Little Dinosaur, Marvel Productions, Hanna-Barbera, Wild West C.O.W.-Boys of Moo Mesa, Red Planet, Freakazoid!, Adventures in Odyssey, Nickelodeon Animation Studio, Butt Ugly Martians, Make Way for Noddy, Danger Rangers), character designer (ChalkZone) and art director (Alvin and the Chipmunks), dies at age 60.
 June 19: Selby Kelly, American comic artist and animator (Walt Disney Animation, Warner Bros. Animation Studios, MGM Animation, Walter Lantz, George Pal's Puppetoons, Hanna-Barbera, Jay Ward, Bill Melendez, Chuck Jones), dies at age 87.
 June 24: Paul Winchell, American ventriloquist and actor (voice of Tigger in Winnie the Pooh, Dick Dastardly in Wacky Races and Dastardly and Muttley in their Flying Machines, Shun Gon in The Aristocats, Gargamel in The Smurfs, Boomer in The Fox and the Hound, Zummi Gummi in Disney's Adventures of the Gummi Bears), dies at age 82.
 June 25: John Fiedler, American actor (voice of Piglet in Winnie the Pooh, Father Sexton in Robin Hood, Porcupine in The Fox and the Hound, Rudy in The Emperor's New Groove), dies at age 80.

July
 July 2: Norm Prescott, American animation producer (co-founder of Filmation), dies at age 78.
 July 11: Frances Langford, American singer (sang the Once Upon a Wintertime segment in Melody Time), dies at age 92.
 July 20: James Doohan, Canadian actor (voiced Scotty in Star Trek: The Animated Series), dies at age 85.
 July 21: Long John Baldry, English-Canadian singer and actor (voice of Dr. Robotnik in Adventures of Sonic the Hedgehog, Mistle Toad in Toad Patrol, Komplex in Bucky O'Hare and the Toad Wars), dies at age 64.
 July 26: James O'Brien, American animator (The Simpsons), dies at age 33.
 July 27: Marten Toonder, Dutch comics artist and animator (Toonder Animation, Als Je Begrijpt Wat Ik Bedoel (The Dragon That Wasn't (Or Was He?)), dies at age 93.

August
August 1: Wim Boost, aka Wibo, Dutch comics artist, cartoonist and animator, dies at age 87.
 August 2: Loulie Jean Norman, American coloratura soprano singer (voice of Penelope Pinfeather in Melody and Toot, Whistle, Plunk and Boom), dies at age 92.
 August 9: Nikolay Serebryakov, Soviet and Russian director of animated films dies at age 76.
 August 16: Joe Ranft, American screenwriter, comedian, storyboard artist, magician, animator, and animation director (Walt Disney Company, Pixar) and actor (voice of Igor in The Nightmare Before Christmas, Heimlich the caterpillar in A Bug's Life, Lenny the binoculars in Toy Story, Wheezy the penguin in Toy Story 2, Claws Ward in Monsters, Inc., Jacques the shrimp in Finding Nemo, Red and Peterbilt in Cars), dies at age 45.
August 23: Brock Peters, American actor (voice of General Newcastle in Challenge of the GoBots, Tormack in Galtar and the Golden Lance, Boneyard in Gravedale High, Bloth in The Pirates of Dark Water, Lucius Fox in Batman: The Animated Series, Dark Kat in Swat Kats: The Radical Squadron, Jomo in The Wild Thornberrys, Chronos in the Johnny Bravo episode "Bearly Enough Time!", Morris Grant / Soul Power in the Static Shock episode "Blast from the Past"), dies at age 78.

September
 September 2: Bob Denver, American actor (voice of Gilligan in The New Adventures of Gilligan and Gilligan's Planet, himself in The Simpsons episode "Simpson Tide"), dies from pneumonia at age 70.
 September 24: Tommy Bond, American actor (voice of Beans in Looney Tunes, speaking voice of Owl Jolson in I Love to Singa), dies at age 79.
 September 25: Don Adams, American actor and comedian (voice of Tennessee Tuxedo in Tennessee Tuxedo and His Tales, the title character in Inspector Gadget, Gadget Boy in Gadget Boy & Heather, Principal Hickey in Pepper Ann, voiced himself in The New Scooby-Doo Movies episode "The Exterminator"), dies from lymphoma at age 82.

October
 October 2: Hamilton Camp, English actor (voice of Gizmoduck in DuckTales, Greedy and Harmony Smurf in The Smurfs, young Barney Rubble in The Flintstone Kids, Dracula in Scooby-Doo! and the Reluctant Werewolf, Professor Chromedome in The Tick, Merlin in House of Mouse), dies at age 70.
 October 7: Charles Rocket, American actor, comedian, musician and television news reporter (voice of Leo Lionheart Jr. in MGM sing-along videos, Firrikash in Titan A.E., Mission Control 1961 in Fly Me to the Moon, Frederick Fournier in The New Batman Adventures episode "Mean Seasons", narrator in Yu-Gi-Oh! The Movie: Pyramid of Light, Oli Slick Monster in The Adventures of Hyperman episode "Oceans a Leavin'", Crewcut in the Static Shock episode "She-Bang"), commits suicide at age 56.
 October 16: Elmer Dresslar Jr., American actor (voice of the Jolly Green Giant), dies at age 80.
 October 20: Eva Švankmajerová, Czech painter, ceramist, poet, animator, designer, director and producer, and wife of Jan Švankmajer, dies at age 65.
 October 29: Lloyd Bochner, Canadian actor (voice of Hamilton Hill in Batman: The Animated Series and The New Batman Adventures), dies at age 81.

November
 November 5: Derek Lamb, English animator and film producer (Special Delivery, Mystery!, Sports Cartoons, Sesame Street), dies at age 69.
 November 7: Harry Thompson, English radio and TV producer, comedy writer, novelist and TV writer (co-creator of Monkey Dust), dies at age 45 from cancer.
 November 11: Keith Andes, American actor (voice of Birdman in Birdman and the Galaxy Trio), dies at age 85.
 November 24: Pat Morita, Japanese-American actor and comedian (voice of Mr. Miyagi in the opening narration of The Karate Kid, The Emperor of China in Mulan and Mulan II, King Makahana in the Happily Ever After: Fairy Tales for Every Child episode "Puss in Boots", Mr. Straw in the Adventures from the Book of Virtues episode "Charity", Master Udon in the SpongeBob SquarePants episode "Karate Island", himself in the Robot Chicken episode "S&M Present"), dies from kidney failure at age 73.
 November 26: Stan Berenstain, American author and illustrator (co-creator of The Berenstain Bears), dies from cancer at age 82.
 November 28: Miroslav Štěpánek, Czech animator, film director, sculptor, screenwriter, illustrator and graphic designer (Pojďte pane, budeme si hrát, aka Hey Mister, Let's Play!), dies at age 81.

December
 December 22: Aurora Miranda, Brazilian singer and actress (sang and danced with Donald Duck and Jose Carioca in The Three Caballeros), dies at age 90.

See also
2005 in anime

References

External links 
Animated works of the year, listed in the IMDb

 
2000s in animation